This is the complete list of women's Olympic medalists in gymnastics.

Artistic gymnastics

Current program

All-around, individual

All-around, team

Note: The International Gymnastics Federation recommended to the IOC that the medals of the Chinese team be stripped, and awarded to the fourth-placed United States team, as it was revealed that Dong Fangxiao was underage (14, with age limit >16) at the time. The IOC upheld the FIG decision in April 2010.

Balance beam

Floor exercise

Uneven bars

Vault

Discontinued event

Portable apparatus, team

Rhythmic gymnastics

All-around, individual

All-around, group

Trampoline

Individual

See also

List of top Olympic gymnastics medalists

References

 International Olympic Committee results database

Gymnastics (women)
Olympic medalists
Gymnastics

Lists of medalists in gymnastics